Deli Ji-ye Mandani (also Romanized as Delī Jī-ye Māndanī; also known as Delī Jī-ye Soflá) is a village in Poshteh-ye Zilayi Rural District, Sarfaryab District, Charam County, Kohgiluyeh and Boyer-Ahmad Province, Iran. At the 2006 census, its population was 24, in 5 families.

References 

Populated places in Charam County